Stefano Paolo Bonomo (born January 25, 1993) is an American retired soccer player who played as a forward.

Career

Youth and college
Born in Hillsborough, California Bonomo began his career in the youth ranks of the Burlingame Juventus club, winning the state cup in 2004. He also played for De Anza Force. Bonomo  played college soccer with the California Golden Bears from 2011 to 2014.  While with the Golden Bears the forward played in 67 matches scoring 23 goals and recording 8 assists. During the 2014 season Bonomo was named to the All-Pac-12 Conference First Team after scoring 12 goals in 17 matches.

Professional
Bonomo was selected with the 39th overall pick in the 2015 MLS SuperDraft by New York Red Bulls. However, Bonomo did not sign with the club, instead opting for trials with European clubs including, Polish side Miedź Legnica and England’s Sheffield Wednesday.

After returning from Europe, Bonomo went on trial with New York Red Bulls and signed with New York Red Bulls II on July 29, 2015. Bonomo  made his debut for the club on August 2, 2015, appearing as a second-half substitute in a 2–1 victory against Saint Louis FC. On August 12, 2015, Bonomo  scored his first goal as a professional with a 73rd-minute equalizer  helping NYRB II to a 1–1  draw against Charlotte Independence. On August 22, 2015, Bonomo scored New York's opening goal in a 2–0 victory over Toronto FC II, he also assisted Devon Williams on the final goal of the match.

On May 7, 2016 Bonomo scored his first goal of the season scoring the game-winning goal in a 3–1 victory over Pittsburgh Riverhounds. On June 26, 2016 Bonomo helped New York to a 4–0 victory against the Wilmington Hammerheads scoring his second goal of the season. On October 23, 2016 Bonomo came on as a second-half substitute and was involved in two late goals to help New York to a 5–1 victory over Swope Park Rangers in the 2016 USL Cup Final.

On July 29, 2017 Bonomo scored his first goal of the season in a 2–1 loss against Louisville City FC, this was his second match of the season after returning from a long term injury. On October 7, 2017, Bonomo recorded his first hat trick as a professional, helping New York to a 6–5 victory over Orlando City B. He ended the 2017 season leading the team in goals with 13 in 16 matches.

On December 18, 2017 it was announced that Bonomo had signed a contract with New York Red Bulls to play with the first team. He was loaned to New York Red Bulls II during the 2018 season and on April 14, 2018 he scored his first goal of the season and assisted on two other in a 5–0 victory over Tampa Bay Rowdies.

On January 23, 2020, Bonomo announced his decision to retire from playing professional soccer.

International
Bonomo was born in the United States and is of Italian and Japanese descent. He was called into United States U-18 National Team training camps in February and April 2011.

Career statistics

Honors
New York Red Bulls II
USL Cup: 2016

References

External links 
calbears.com player profile

1993 births
Living people
People from Hillsborough, California
American people of Italian descent
American sportspeople of Japanese descent
American soccer players
Soccer players from California
Sportspeople from the San Francisco Bay Area
Association football forwards
California Golden Bears men's soccer players
New York Red Bulls II players
New York Red Bulls players
New York Red Bulls draft picks
USL Championship players
Major League Soccer players
Tampa Bay Rowdies players
Sacramento Republic FC players
De Anza Force players